"Juice" is the twenty-ninth single by B'z, released on July 12, 2000. This song is one of B'z many number-one singles on the Oricon chart. Although sales aren't very high like their previous single (about 650,000 copies), it is well known among fans being usually played live. It was also often used as a tie up in TV.

Track listing 
Juice - 4:02
Ubu - 3:42

Certifications

References 
B'z performance at Oricon

External links
B'z official website

2000 singles
B'z songs
Oricon Weekly number-one singles
Songs written by Tak Matsumoto
Songs written by Koshi Inaba
2000 songs